Albany is a city and county seat of Gentry County, Missouri, United States. With an annual growth rate of -0.30%. The population was 1,679 at the 2020 census.

History
Albany was originally called Athens, and under the latter name was platted in 1845. The present name is a transfer from Albany, New York, the native home of a local judge. A post office called Albany has been in operation since 1857.

The Albany Carnegie Public Library, Gentry County Courthouse, and Samuel and Pauline Peery House are listed on the National Register of Historic Places.

Geography 
Albany is located at the intersection of US Route 136 and Missouri Route 85. The East Fork of the Grand River flows past to the west and joins the Grand River three miles to the south of the city. Stanberry is eleven miles to the west and Bethany is about 14 miles to the east in Harrison County.

Climate 
Situated in a transitional climate area, Albany has a humid continental climate (Köppen climate classification Dfa) with hot, humid summers and cold winters.

Demographics

2010 census
As of the census of 2010, there were 1,730 people, 753 households, and 446 families living in the city. The racial makeup of the city was 98.2% White, 0.5% African American, 0.3% Native American, 0.5% Asian, 0.2% from other races, and 0.5% from two or more races. Hispanic or Latino of any race were 0.6% of the population.

There were 753 households, of which 26.2% had children under the age of 18 living with them, 45.6% were married couples living together, 10.1% had a female householder with no husband present, 3.6% had a male householder with no wife present, and 40.8% were non-families. 35.7% of all households were made up of individuals, and 18.8% had someone living alone who was 65 years of age or older. The average household size was 2.21 and the average family size was 2.87.

The median age in the city was 44.1 years. 21.6% of residents were under the age of 18; 7.3% were between the ages of 18 and 24; 22.1% were from 25 to 44; 26% were from 45 to 64; and 22.9% were 65 years of age or older. The gender makeup of the city was 45.8% male and 54.2% female.

2000 census
As of the census of 2000, there were 1,937 people, 858 households, and 515 families living in the city. The population density was 790.6 people per square mile (305.3/km). There were 948 housing units at an average density of 386.9 per square mile (149.4/km). The racial makeup of the city was 99.07% White, 0.05% African American, 0.21% Native American, 0.10% Asian, 0.05% from other races, and 0.52% from two or more races. Hispanic or Latino of any race were 0.31% of the population.

There were 858 households, out of which 26.1% had children under the age of 18 living with them, 48.8% were married couples living together, 8.2% had a female householder with no husband present, and 39.9% were non-families. 37.2% of all households were made up of individuals, and 23.3% had someone living alone who was 65 years of age or older. The average household size was 2.18 and the average family size was 2.87.

In the city the population was spread out, with 22.2% under the age of 18, 7.3% from 18 to 24, 22.7% from 25 to 44, 22.3% from 45 to 64, and 25.6% who were 65 years of age or older. The median age was 44 years. For every 100 females, there were 88.8 males. For every 100 females age 18 and over, there were 84.5 males.

The median income for a household in the city was $25,912, and the median income for a family was $36,042. Males had a median income of $24,321 versus $21,813 for females. The per capita income for the city was $17,552. About 9.8% of families and 11.1% of the population were below the poverty line, including 10.8% of those under age 18 and 10.8% of those age 65 or over.

Education
Albany R-III School District operates one elementary school and Albany MS & HS.

The town has a lending library, the Carnegie Library of Albany.

References

External links
 Historic maps of Albany in the Sanborn Maps Collection at the University of Missouri
 
 

Cities in Gentry County, Missouri
County seats in Missouri
Cities in Missouri